Kęstutis Grinius (born August 10, 1956 in Marijampolė) is a Lithuanian politician. In 1990 he was among those who signed the Act of the Re-Establishment of the State of Lithuania.

External links
Biography 

1956 births
Living people
Lithuanian politicians
People from Marijampolė
Signatories of the Act of the Re-Establishment of the State of Lithuania
20th-century Lithuanian politicians